The 1984–85 Liga Bet season saw Beitar Nahariya, Hapoel Aliyah Kfar Saba, Hapoel Or Yehuda and Hapoel Kiryat Malakhi win their regional divisions and promoted to Liga Alef.

At the bottom, Hapoel Makr, Hapoel Kafr Sumei (from North A division), Hapoel Kafr Qara, Hapoel Emek Hefer (from North B division), Beitar Katamonim, Hapoel Neve Golan (from South A division), Beitar Kiryat Malakhi and Beitar Kiryat Gat (from South B division) were all automatically relegated to Liga Gimel.

North Division A

North Division B

South Division A

South Division B

References
 Football 1985/86 (Page 135), Israel Football Association, 1985 

Liga Bet seasons
Israel
4